Harvey Thomas Greenslade (born 8 April 2004) is an English footballer who plays as a striker for Truro City on loan from EFL League One club Bristol Rovers.

Career
Greenslade first joined Bristol Rovers at the under-7s. During the 2021–22 season, Greenslade spent time on loan in the Southern Football League with Division One South club Cinderford Town and Premier Division club Tiverton Town, sandwiching a successful spell with Hellenic League Premier Division club Tuffley Rovers.

Greenslade signed his first professional contract with the club in May 2022 having been invited to train with the first-team for the last few weeks of the previous season. On 30 August 2022, Greenslade made his senior debut for Bristol Rovers from the bench in a 1–1 EFL Trophy draw with Plymouth Argyle, missing a penalty in the subsequent shootout defeat. On 6 September 2022, Greenslade joined National League South club Chippenham Town on loan until January 2023. In February 2023, he joined Truro City on a one-month loan deal.

Personal life
Greenslade's twin sister, Lily, is also a footballer who plays for Bristol City having also featured previously for Bristol Rovers and England U15,U16 and U18's.

Career Statistics

References

External links
Harvey Greenslade at Aylesbury United

2004 births
Living people
Footballers from Bristol
English footballers
Association football forwards
Bristol Rovers F.C. players
Tuffley Rovers F.C. players
Cinderford Town A.F.C. players
Tiverton Town F.C. players
Chippenham Town F.C. players
Truro City F.C. players
Southern Football League players
National League (English football) players